

The Caproni Ca.122 was a prototype bomber and military transport aircraft built in Italy in the mid-1930s. It was a conventional low-wing monoplane with fixed undercarriage. Power was provided by twin Gnome-Rhône 14K radial engines. No production ensued for either this or the 28-seat airliner version designated Ca.123.

Specifications (Ca.123)

References

 
 

Ca.122
1930s Italian bomber aircraft
1930s Italian military transport aircraft
1930s Italian airliners
Low-wing aircraft
Twin-engined tractor aircraft